Daniel Heidman (born November 10, 1982) is a former Israeli professional football (soccer) player.

Footnotes

External links

1982 births
Israeli Jews
Living people
Israeli footballers
Israel under-21 international footballers
Maccabi Tel Aviv F.C. players
Hapoel Kfar Saba F.C. players
Beitar Jerusalem F.C. players
Hapoel Petah Tikva F.C. players
Hakoah Maccabi Amidar Ramat Gan F.C. players
Hapoel Rishon LeZion F.C. players
Hapoel Ashkelon F.C. players
Liga Leumit players
Israeli Premier League players
Israeli people of German-Jewish descent
Footballers from Ra'anana
Association football midfielders